Gargi Memorial Institute of Technology abbreviated as GMIT is a private engineering institution in Kolkata, West Bengal, India which offers undergraduate(B.Tech) four-year engineering degree courses in five disciplines. The college is affiliated to Maulana Abul Kalam Azad University of Technology(MAKAUT).

References 

Engineering colleges in West Bengal
Universities and colleges in South 24 Parganas district
Colleges affiliated to West Bengal University of Technology
Educational institutions established in 2011
2011 establishments in West Bengal